Bob Mulder (born 31 January 1974) is a retired professional footballer from the Netherlands, who played for clubs like FC Groningen, MVV Maastricht, Heracles Almelo and BV Veendam.

External links
 Player profile at Voetbal International

1981 births
Living people
Dutch footballers
Dutch expatriate footballers
FC Groningen players
MVV Maastricht players
Heracles Almelo players
SC Veendam players
SV Meppen players
VfB Oldenburg players
Expatriate footballers in Germany
People from Delfzijl
Association football midfielders
Dutch expatriate sportspeople in Germany
Footballers from Groningen (province)